Predmore is an unincorporated community in Olmsted County, in the U.S. state of Minnesota.

History
Predmore was laid out in 1891, and named for J. W. Predmore, an early settler. A post office was established at Predmore in 1892, and remained in operation until 1905.

References

Unincorporated communities in Olmsted County, Minnesota
Unincorporated communities in Minnesota